Ultimo may refer to:

 Ultimo, New South Wales
 Ulten, comune in Italy, Italian name Ultimo
 Ultimo (Marvel Comics), comic books character
 Ultimo (brand), Scottish designer lingerie brand
 Karakuridôji Ultimo, a Japanese manga  
 Ultimo (singer), Italian singer
 ult. or ultimo., a Latin abbreviation, previously used especially in business correspondence for ultimo mense ("last month")

See also
 Ultima (disambiguation)
 Ultimate (disambiguation)
 ULT (disambiguation)